Minuscule 507 (in the Gregory-Aland numbering), ε 142 (in the Soden numbering), is a Greek minuscule manuscript of the New Testament, on parchment. Palaeographically it has been assigned to the 11th century. 
Scrivener labeled it by number 493. It was adapted for liturgical use.

Description 

The codex contains the complete text of the four Gospels on 221 parchment leaves (size ). It is written in two columns per page, 26 lines per page.

There is also a division according to the smaller Ammonian Sections (in Mark 234 sections, the last section in 16:9), with references to the Eusebian Canons (written in the same line as Ammonian Sections).

Text 

The Greek text of the codex is a representative of the Byzantine text-type. Hermann von Soden included it to the textual family Kx. Aland placed it in Category V.

According to the Claremont Profile Method it represents textual family Kx in Luke 1 and Luke 20. In Luke 10 no profile was made.

History 

The manuscript was written by Abraham Teudas, a scribe. In 1724 (or 1727) the manuscript came from the Pantokratoros monastery to England and was presented to archbishop of Canterbury, William Wake, along with the codices 73, 74, 506-520. Wake presented it to the Christ Church College in Oxford. In 1732 John Walker slightly collated it for Bentley.

The manuscript was added to the list of New Testament minuscule manuscripts by F. H. A. Scrivener (493) and C. R. Gregory (507). Gregory saw it in 1883.

It is currently housed at the Christ Church (Wake 21) in Oxford.

See also 

 List of New Testament minuscules
 Biblical manuscript
 Textual criticism

Notes

References

Further reading 

 George William Kitchin, Catalogus codicum MSS. qui in bibliotheca Aedis Christi, Oxford 1867.
 Bernard de Montfaucon, Palaeographia graeca (Paris, 1708), p. 46.

External links 

Greek New Testament minuscules
11th-century biblical manuscripts